Vinny Perretta (born October 14, 1985) is an American wide receiver. He formerly played with the Minnesota Vikings of the National Football League. He was signed by the Vikings as an undrafted free agent in 2009. He played college football at Boise State. He retired from the NFL in April 2010.

Early years 

Perretta is  2004 graduate of La Costa Canyon High School in Encinitas, CA where he was a two-time First-team All-Avocado League selection. He earned offensive team MVP honors and was on all-academic team. He gained over 1,000 yards in total offense as a senior with 12 touchdowns, including two on kickoff returns. He lettered in football three times and track and field once.

College career 
Perretta is best known for throwing the touchdown pass in overtime to Derek Schouman in the 2007 Fiesta Bowl to help Boise State beat Oklahoma 43-42 in what many consider to be the best college football game ever played.

In 2008, as a senior, Perretta caught 36 passes for 578 yards and 2 touchdowns and helped Boise State post an undefeated 12-0 regular season mark. In 2007, he played in four games before being sidelined with shoulder injury. He made nine catches for 120 yards and five rushes for 30 yards and a touchdown.  In 2006, he played wide receiver and running back and finished third on team in rushing with 316 yards and three touchdowns on 55 carries while finishing fifth on in receiving with 17 catches for 124 yards and two touchdowns and was named to the All-WAC academic team. In 2005, he was part of Boise State’s wide receiver rotation and played in all 13 games, catching 12 passes for 169 yards. In 2004, he was named offensive scout team player of the year and he red-shirted after walking on prior to the 2004 season.

Professional career 

On May 8, 2009 the Minnesota Vikings signed Perretta and Boise State teammate Ian Johnson. Perretta was re-signed on April 15, 2010. However, he decided to retire shortly after.

Post-career life 
Perretta is now a sales representative in Boise, Idaho. He is married with two children. Peretta enjoys golf as a hobby.

References

External links
Minnesota Vikings Bio
Boise State Broncos Bio

American football wide receivers
Boise State Broncos football players
Living people
Players of American football from San Diego
Minnesota Vikings players
1985 births